The Atari ST is a line of personal computers from Atari Corporation and the successor to the Atari 8-bit family. The initial model, the Atari 520ST, had limited release in April–June 1985 and was widely available in July. It was the first personal computer with a bitmapped color GUI, using a version of Digital Research's GEM from February 1985. The Atari 1040ST, released in 1986 with 1 MB of RAM, was the first home computer with a cost-per-kilobyte of less than US$1.

"ST" officially stands for "Sixteen/Thirty-two", referring to the Motorola 68000's 16-bit external bus and 32-bit internals. The system was designed by a small team led by Shiraz Shivji. Alongside the Macintosh, Amiga, Apple IIGS, and Acorn Archimedes, the ST is part of a mid-1980s generation of computers with 16- or 32-bit processors, 256 KB or more of RAM, and mouse-controlled graphical user interfaces.

The ST was sold with either Atari's color monitor or less expensive monochrome monitor. Color graphics modes are available only on the former while the highest-resolution mode requires the monochrome monitor. Some models can display the color modes on a TV.

In some markets, particularly Germany, the ST gained a foothold for CAD and desktop publishing. With built-in MIDI ports, it was popular for music sequencing and as a controller of musical instruments among amateurs and professional musicians.

The 520ST and 1040ST were followed by the Mega series, the STE, and the portable STacy. In the early 1990s, Atari released three final evolutions of the ST, with significant technical differences from the original models: the Atari TT (1990), the Mega STE (1991), and the Falcon (1992). Atari discontinued the entire ST computer line in 1993, shifting its entire focus on the 64-bit Jaguar video game system.

Development 
The Atari ST was born from the rivalry between home computer makers Atari, Inc. and Commodore International.

Amiga contract 
Jay Miner, one of the original designers of the custom chips found in the Atari 2600 and Atari 8-bit family, tried to convince Atari management to create a new chipset for a video game console and computer. When his idea was rejected, he left Atari to form a small think tank called Hi-Toro in 1982 and began designing the new "Lorraine" chipset. The company, which was later renamed Amiga Corporation, pretended to sell video game controllers to deceive its competition while it developed a Lorraine-based computer.

Amiga ran out of capital to complete Lorraine's development, and Atari, by then owned by Warner Communications, paid Amiga to continue its work. In return, Atari received exclusive use of the Lorraine design for one year as a video game console. After that time, Atari had the right to add a keyboard and market the complete computer, designated the 1850XLD. As Atari was heavily involved with Disney at the time, it was later code-named "Mickey", and the 256K memory expansion board was codenamed "Minnie".

Tramel Technology 
After leaving Commodore International in January 1984, Jack Tramiel formed Tramel (without an "i") Technology, Ltd. with his sons and other ex-Commodore employees and, in April, began planning a new computer. They initially considered the National Semiconductor NS32000 microprocessor, but were disappointed with its performance. This started the move to the 68000 processor. Their lead designer was ex-Commodore employee Shiraz Shivji, who previously worked on the Commodore 64's development.

In mid-1984, Atari was losing about one million dollars per day. Interested in Atari's overseas manufacturing and worldwide distribution network for his new computer, Tramiel negotiated with Warner in May and June 1984. He secured funding and bought Atari's Consumer Division (which included the console and home computer departments) in July. As executives and engineers left Commodore to join Tramel Technology, Commodore responded by filing lawsuits against four former engineers for infringement of trade secrets.

The Tramiels did not purchase the employee contracts with the assets of Atari Inc., so one of their first acts was to interview Atari Inc. employees to decide whom to hire at what was essentially a brand new company. At the time of the purchase of Atari Inc's assets, there were roughly 900 employees remaining from a peak of 10,000. After the interviews, approximately 100 employees were hired to work at Tramel Technology, which soon changed its name to Atari Corporation.

A custom sound processor called AMY was a tentatively planned component for the new ST computer design, but the chip needed more time to complete, so AMY was dropped in favor of a commodity Yamaha sound chip.

During this time in late July or early August, Leonard Tramiel discovered the original Amiga contract, which required Amiga Corporation to deliver the Lorraine chipset to Atari on June 30, 1984 . Amiga Corp. had sought more monetary support from investors in early 1984, including Tramel Technology, which wished to eliminate nearly everyone at Amiga.

Commodore and Amiga 
Amid rumors that Tramiel was negotiating to buy Atari, Amiga Corp. entered discussions with Commodore. This led to Commodore wanting to purchase Amiga Corporation outright, which Commodore believed would cancel any outstanding contracts, including Atari's. Instead of Amiga Corp. delivering Lorraine to Atari, Commodore delivered a check of $500,000 to Atari on Amiga's behalf, in effect returning the funds Atari invested in Amiga for the chipset. Tramiel countered by suing Amiga Corp. on August 13, 1984, seeking damages and an injunction to bar Amiga (and effectively Commodore) from producing anything with its technology.

At Commodore, the lawsuit left the Amiga team in limbo during mid-1984. Nothing of the status of the chipset, the Lorraine computer, or the team's fate was known. In late 1984, Commodore informed the team of reactivating the Lorraine project, and the chipset was to be improved, the operating system (OS) developed, and the hardware design completed. Commodore announced the Amiga 1000 with the Lorraine chipset in July 1985, and the delay gave Atari, with its many former Commodore engineers, time to deliver the first Atari ST units in June 1985. In March 1987, the two companies settled the dispute out of court in a closed decision.

Operating system 
With its hardware design nearing completion, the Atari team started looking at the operating system. Soon after the Atari buyout, Microsoft suggested to Tramiel that it could port Windows to the platform, but the delivery date was out by two years, far too long for their needs. Another possibility was Digital Research, which was working on a new GUI-based system then known as Crystal, soon to become GEM. Another option was to write a new operating system, but this was rejected as Atari management was unsure whether the company had the required expertise.

Digital Research was fully committed to the Intel platform, so a team from Atari was sent to the Digital Research headquarters to work with the "Monterey Team", which comprised a mixture of Atari and Digital Research engineers. Atari's Leonard Tramiel was the Atari person overseeing "Project Jason" (also known as The Operating System) for the Atari ST series, named for designer and developer Jason Loveman.

GEM is based on CP/M-68K, essentially a direct port of CP/M to the 68000. By 1985, CP/M was becoming increasingly outdated; it did not support subdirectories, for example. Digital Research was also in the process of building GEMDOS, a new DOS-like operating system for GEM, and debated whether a port of it could be completed in time for product delivery in June. The decision was eventually taken to port it, resulting in a GEMDOS file system which became part of Atari TOS (for "The Operating System", colloquially known as the "Tramiel Operating System"). This gave the ST a fast, hierarchical file system, essential for hard drives, and provided programmers with function calls similar to MS-DOS. The Atari ST character set is based on codepage 437.

Several third-party OSes were developed for, or ported to, the Atari ST. Unix clones include Idris, Minix, and the MiNT OS which was developed specifically for the Atari ST.

Release
After six months of intensive effort following Tramiel's takeover, Atari announced the 520ST at the Winter Consumer Electronics Show in Las Vegas in January 1985. InfoWorld described prototypes shown at computer shows as a "typical Commodore-64-style, corner-cutting, low-cost Jack Tramiel product", but Atari unexpectedly displayed the ST at Atlanta COMDEX in May. Due to its similarities to the original Macintosh and Tramiel's role in its development, it was quickly nicknamed the Jackintosh. Atari's rapid development of the ST amazed many, but others were skeptical, citing its "cheap" appearance, Atari's uncertain financial health, and poor relations between Tramiel-led Commodore and software developers.

Atari ST print advertisements stated, "America, We Built It For You", and quoted Atari president Sam Tramiel: "We promised. We delivered. With pride, determination, and good old ATARI know how". But Atari was out of cash, Jack Tramiel admitted that sales of its 8-bit family were "very, very slow", and employees feared that he would shut the company down.

In early 1985, the 520ST shipped to the press, developers, and user groups, and in early July 1985 for general retail sales. It saved the company. By November, Atari stated that more than 50 thousand 520STs had been sold, "with U.S. sales alone well into five figures". The machine had gone from concept to store shelves in a little under one year.

Atari had intended to release the 130ST with 128 KB of RAM and the 260ST with 256 KB. However, the ST initially shipped without TOS in ROM and required booting TOS from floppy, taking 206 KB RAM away from applications. The 260ST was launched in Europe on a limited basis. Early models have six ROM sockets for easy upgrades to TOS. New ROMs were released a few months later and were included in new machines and as an upgrade for older machines.

Atari originally intended to include GEM's GDOS (Graphical Device Operating System), which allows programs to send GEM VDI (Virtual Device Interface) commands to drivers loaded by GDOS. This allows developers to send VDI instructions to other devices simply by pointing to it. However, GDOS was not ready at the time the ST started shipping and was included in software packages and with later ST machines. Later versions of GDOS support vector fonts.

A limited set of GEM fonts were included in the ROMs, including the ST's standard 8x8 pixel graphical character set. It contains four characters which can be placed together in a square, forming the face of J. R. "Bob" Dobbs (the figurehead of the Church of the SubGenius).

The ST was less expensive than most contemporaries, including the Macintosh Plus, and is faster than many. Largely as a result of its price and performance factor, the ST became fairly popular, especially in Europe where foreign-exchange rates amplified prices. The company's English advertising slogan of the era was "Power Without the Price". An Atari ST and terminal emulation software was much cheaper than a Digital VT220 terminal, commonly needed by offices with central computers.

By late 1985, the 520STM added an RF modulator for TV display.

Industry reaction
Computer Gaming World stated that Tramiel's poor pre-Atari reputation would likely make computer stores reluctant to deal with the company, hurting its distribution of the ST. One retailer said, "If you can believe Lucy when she holds the football for Charlie Brown, you can believe Jack Tramiel"; another said that because of its experience with Tramiel, "our interest in Atari is zero, zilch". Neither Atari nor Commodore could persuade large chains like ComputerLand or BusinessLand to sell its products. Observers criticized Atari's erratic discussion of its stated plans for the new computer, as it shifted between using mass merchandisers, specialty computer stores, and both. When asked at COMDEX, Atari executives could not name any computer stores that would carry the ST. After a meeting with Atari, one analyst said, "We've seen marketing strategies changed before our eyes".

Tramiel's poor reputation influenced potential software developers. One said, "Dealing with Commodore is like dealing with Attila the Hun. I don't know if Tramiel will be following his old habits ... I don't see a lot of people rushing to get software on the machine." Large business-software companies like Lotus, Ashton-Tate, and Microsoft did not promise software for either the ST or Amiga, and the majority of software companies were hesitant to support another platform beyond the IBM PC, Apple, and Commodore 64. Philippe Kahn of Borland said, "These days, if I were a consumer, I'd stick with companies [such as Apple and IBM] I know will be around".

At Las Vegas COMDEX in November 1985, the industry was surprised by more than 30 companies exhibiting ST software while the Amiga had almost none. After Atlanta COMDEX, The New York Times reported that "more than 100 software titles will be available for the [ST], most written by small software houses that desperately need work", and contrasted the "small, little-known companies" at Las Vegas with the larger ones like Electronic Arts and Activision, which planned Amiga applications.

Trip Hawkins of Electronic Arts said, "I don't think Atari understands the software business. I'm still skeptical about its resources and its credibility." Although Michael Berlyn of Infocom promised that his company would quickly publish all of its games for the new computer, he doubted many others would soon do so. Spinnaker and Lifetree were more positive, both promising to release ST software. Spinnaker said that "Atari has a vastly improved attitude toward software developers. They are eager to give us technical support and machines". Lifetree said, "We are giving Atari high priority". Some, such as Software Publishing Corporation, were unsure of whether to develop for the ST or the Amiga. John C. Dvorak wrote that the public saw both Commodore and Atari as selling "cheap disposable" game machines, in part because of their computers' sophisticated graphics.

Design

Original housing 

The original 520ST case design was created by Ira Velinsky, Atari's chief Industrial Designer. It is wedge-shaped, with bold angular lines and a series of grilles cut into the rear for airflow. The keyboard has soft tactile feedback and rhomboid-shaped function keys across the top. It is an all-in-one unit, similar to earlier home computers like the Commodore 64, but with a larger keyboard with cursor keys and a numeric keypad. The original has an external floppy drive (SF354) and AC adapter. Starting with the 1040ST, the floppy drive and power supply are integrated into the base unit.

Port connections 

The ports on the 520ST remained largely unchanged over its history.

Standard
 RS-232c serial port (DB25 male, operating as basic 9-conductor DTE)
 Centronics printer port (DB25 female, officially compliant only with the most basic unidirectional standard with a single, "Busy" input line; unofficially offering some bidirectional capabilities)
 Atari joystick ports (DE-9 male) for the mouse and game controllers
 2 MIDI ports (5-pin DIN, "IN" and "OUT")

Because of its bi-directional design, the Centronics printer port can be used for joystick input, and several games used available adaptors that used the printer socket, providing two additional 9-pin joystick ports.

ST-specific
 Monitor port (custom 13-pin DIN, 12 of the pins in a rectangular pattern, carrying signals for both RGB and monochrome monitors, monophonic audio and, in later models, composite video)
 ACSI (similar to SCSI) DMA port (custom-sized 19-pin D-sub, for hard disks and laser printers, capable of up to 2 MByte/s with efficient programming)
 Floppy port (14-pin DIN, listed as operating at 250 kbit/s)
 ST cartridge port (double-sided 40-contact edge connector socket, for 128 KB ROM cartridges)

Monitor
The ST supports a monochrome or colour monitor. The colour hardware supports two resolutions: 320 × 200 pixels, with 16 of 512 colours; and 640 × 200, with 4 of 512 colours. The monochrome monitor was less expensive and has a single resolution of 640 × 400 at 71.25 Hz. The attached monitor determines available resolutions, so each application either supports both types of monitors or only one. Most ST games require colour with productivity software favouring the monochrome.

Floppy drive

Atari initially used single-sided 3.5 inch floppy disk drives that could store up to 360 KB. Later drives were double-sided and stored 720 KB. Some commercial software, particularly games, shipped by default on single-sided disks, even supplying two 360 KB floppies instead of a single double-sided one, to avoid alienating early adopters.

STs with double-sided drives can read disks formatted by MS-DOS, but IBM PCs can not read Atari disks, because the initial versions of TOS can recognize, read, and write to (but not create) disks in the same specification used by MS-DOS because of differences in the layout of data on track 0.

Later systems

1040ST 

Atari upgraded the basic design in 1986 with the 1040STF, stylized as 1040STF: essentially a 520ST with double the RAM and with the power supply and a double-sided floppy drive built-in instead of external. This adds to the size of the machine, but reduces cable clutter. The joystick and mouse ports, formerly on the right side of the machine, are in a niche underneath the keyboard. An "FM" variant includes an RF modulator allowing a television to be used instead of a monitor.

The trailing "F" and "FM" were often dropped in common usage. In BYTE magazine's March 1986 cover photo of the system, the name plate reads 1040STFM but in the headline and article it's simply "1040ST". 
 
The 1040ST is one of the earliest personal computers shipped with a base RAM configuration of 1 MB. Compute! noted that the 1040ST is the first computer with one megabyte of RAM to sell for less than $2,500.

A limited number of 1040STFs shipped with a single-sided floppy drive.

Mega 
Initial sales were strong, especially in Europe, where Atari sold 75% of its computers. Germany became Atari's strongest market, with small business owners using them for desktop publishing and CAD.

To address this growing market segment, Atari introduced the ST1 at Comdex in 1986. Renamed to Mega, it includes a high-quality detached keyboard, a stronger case to support the weight of a monitor, and an internal bus expansion connector. An optional 20 MB hard drive can be placed below or above the main case. Initially equipped with 2 or 4 MB of RAM (a 1 MB version, the Mega 1, followed), the Mega machines can be combined with Atari laser's printer for a low-cost desktop publishing package.

A custom blitter coprocessor improved some graphics performance, but was not included in all models. Developers wanting to use it had to detect its presence in their programs. Properly written applications using the GEM API automatically make use of the blitter.

STE 
In late 1989, Atari Corporation released the 520STE and 1040STE (also written STE), enhanced version of the ST with improvements to the multimedia hardware and operating system. It features an increased color palette of 4,096 colors from the ST's 512 (though the maximum displayable palette without programming tricks is still limited to 16 in the lowest 320 × 200 resolution, and even fewer in higher resolutions), Genlock support, and a blitter coprocessor (stylized as "BLiTTER") which can quickly move large blocks of data (particularly, graphics data) around in RAM. The STE is the first Atari with PCM audio; using a new chip, it added the ability to play back 8-bit (signed) samples at 6258 Hz, 12517 Hz, 25033 Hz, and even 50066 Hz, via direct memory access (DMA). The channels are arranged as either a mono track or a track of LRLRLRLR... bytes. RAM is now much more simply upgradable via SIMMs.

Two enhanced joystick ports were added (two normal joysticks can be plugged into each port with an adapter), with the new connectors placed in more easily accessed locations on the side of the case. The enhanced joystick ports were re-used in the Atari Jaguar console and are compatible.

The STE models initially had software and hardware conflicts resulting in some applications and video games written for the ST line being unstable or even completely unusable, primarily caused by programming direct hardware calls which bypassed the operating system. Furthermore, even having a joystick plugged in would sometimes cause strange behavior with a few applications (such as the WYSIWYG word-processor application 1st Word Plus). Very little use was made of the extra features of the STE: STE-enhanced and STE-only software was rare.

The last STE machine, the Mega STE, is an STE in a grey Atari TT case that had a switchable 16 MHz, dual-bus design (16-bit external, 32-bit internal), optional Motorola 68881 FPU, built-in 1.44 MB "HD" 3-inch floppy disk drive, VME expansion slot, a network port (very similar to that used by Apple's LocalTalk) and an optional built-in 3" hard drive. It also shipped with TOS 2.00 (better support for hard drives, enhanced desktop interface, memory test, 1.44 MB floppy support, bug fixes). It was marketed as more affordable than a TT but more powerful than an ordinary ST.

Atari TT 

In 1990, Atari released the high-end workstation-oriented Atari TT030, based on a 32 MHz Motorola 68030 processor. The "TT" name ("Thirty-two/Thirty-two") continued the nomenclature because the 68030 chip has 32-bit buses both internally and externally. Originally planned with a 68020 CPU, the TT has improved graphics and more powerful support chips. The case has a new design with an integrated hard-drive enclosure.

Falcon 

The final model of ST computer is the Falcon030. Like the TT, it is 68030-based, at 16 MHz, but with improved video modes and an on-board Motorola 56001 audio digital signal processor. Like the Atari STE, it supports sampling frequencies above 44.1 kHz; the sampling master clock is 98340 Hz (which can be divided by a number between 2 and 16 to get the actual sampling frequencies). It can play the STE sample frequencies (up to 50066 Hz) in 8 or 16 bit, mono or stereo, all by using the same DMA interface as the STE, with a few additions. It can both play back and record samples, with 8 mono channels and 4 stereo channels, allowing musicians to use it for recording to hard drive. Although the 68030 microprocessor can use 32-bit memory, the Falcon uses a 16-bit bus, which reduces performance and cost. In another cost-reduction measure, Atari shipped the Falcon in an inexpensive case much like that of the STF and STE. Aftermarket upgrade kits allow it to be put in a desktop or rack-mount case, with the keyboard separate.

Released in 1992, the Falcon was discontinued by Atari the following year. In Europe, C-Lab licensed the Falcon design from Atari and released the C-Lab Falcon Mk I, identical to Atari's Falcon except for slight modifications to the audio circuitry. The Mk II added an internal 500 MB SCSI hard disk; and the Mk X further added a desktop case. C-Lab Falcons were also imported to the US by some Atari dealers.

Software 
As with the Atari 8-bit family of computers, software publishers attributed their reluctance to produce Atari ST products in part to—as Compute! reported in 1988—the belief in the existence of a "higher-than-normal amount of software piracy". That year, WordPerfect threatened to discontinue the Atari ST version of its word processor because the company discovered that pirate bulletin board systems (BBSs) were distributing it, causing ST-Log to warn that "we had better put a stop to piracy now ... it can have harmful effects on the longevity and health of your computer". In 1989, magazines published a letter by Gilman Louie, head of Spectrum HoloByte. He stated that he had been warned by competitors that releasing a game like Falcon on the ST would fail because BBSs would widely disseminate it. Within 30 days of releasing the non-copy protected ST version, the game was available on BBSs with maps and code wheels. Because the ST market was smaller than that for the IBM PC, it was more vulnerable to piracy which, Louie said, seemed to be better organized and more widely accepted for the ST. He reported that the Amiga version sold in six weeks twice as much as the ST version in nine weeks, and that the Mac and PC versions had four times the sales. Computer Gaming World stated "This is certainly the clearest exposition ... we have seen to date" of why software companies produced less software for the ST than for other computers.

Audio
Plenty of professional quality MIDI-related software was released. The popular Windows and Macintosh applications Cubase and Logic Pro originated on the Atari ST (the latter as Creator, Notator, Notator-SL, and Notator Logic). Another popular and powerful ST music sequencer application, KCS, contains a "Multi-Program Environment" that allows ST users to run other applications, such as the synthesizer patch editing software XoR (now known as Unisyn on the Macintosh), from within the sequencer application.

Music tracker software became popular on the ST, such as the TCB Tracker, aiding the production of quality music from the Yamaha synthesizer, now called chiptunes.

Due to the ST having comparatively large amounts of memory for the time, sound sampling packages became feasible. Replay Professional features a sound sampler using the ST cartridge port to read in parallel from the cartridge port from the ADC. For output of digital sound, it uses the on-board frequency output, sets it to 128 kHz (inaudible) and then modulates the amplitude of that.

MasterTracks Pro originated on Macintosh, then ST, then IBM PC version. It continued on Windows and macOS, along with the original company's notation applications Encore.

Applications

Professional desktop publishing software includes PageStream and Calamus. Word processors include WordPerfect, Microsoft Write, AtariWorks, Signum, Script and First Word (bundled with the machine). Spreadsheets include 3D-Calc, and databases include Zoomracks. Graphics applications include NEOchrome, DEGAS & DEGAS Elite, Deluxe Paint, STAD, and Cyber Paint (which author Jim Kent would later evolve into Autodesk Animator) with advanced features such as 3D design and animation. The Spectrum 512  paint program uses rapid palette switching to expand the on-screen color palette to 512 (up to 46 colors per scan line).

3D computer graphics applications (like Cyber Studio CAD-3D, which author Tom Hudson later developed into Autodesk 3D Studio), brought 3D modelling, sculpting, scripting, and computer animation to the desktop. Video capture and editing applications use dongles connected to the cartridge port for low frame rate, mainly silent and monochrome, but progressed to sound and basic color in still frames. At the end, Spectrum 512 and CAD-3D teamed up to produce realistic 512-color textured 3D renderings, but processing was slow, and Atari's failure to deliver a machine with a math coprocessor had Hudson and Yost looking towards the PC as the future before a finished product could be delivered to the consumer.

Graphical touchscreen point of sale software for restaurants was originally developed for Atari ST by Gene Mosher under the ViewTouch copyright and trademark. Instead of using GEM, he developed a GUI and widget framework for the application using the NEOchrome paint program.

Software development
The 520ST was bundled with both Digital Research Logo and Atari ST BASIC. Third-party BASIC systems with better performance were eventually released: HiSoft BASIC, GFA BASIC, FaST BASIC, DBASIC, LDW BASIC, Omikron BASIC, BASIC 1000D and STOS. In the later years of the Atari ST, Omikron Basic was bundled with it in Germany.

Atari's initial development kit from Atari is a computer and manuals. The  cost discouraged development. It includes a resource kit, C compiler (first Alcyon C, then Mark Williams C), debugger, 68000 assembler, and non-disclosure agreement.

Other development tools include 68000 assemblers (MadMac from Atari, HiSoft Systems's Devpac, TurboAss, GFA-Assembler), Pascal (OSS Personal Pascal, Maxon Pascal, PurePascal), Modula-2, C compilers (Lattice C, Pure C, Megamax C, GNU C, Aztec C, AHCC), LISP, and Prolog.

Games

The ST had success in gaming due to the low cost, fast performance, and colorful graphics. ST game developers include Peter Molyneux, Doug Bell, Jeff Minter, Éric Chahi, Jez San, and David Braben.

The realtime pseudo-3D role-playing video game Dungeon Master, was developed and released first on the ST, as the best-selling software ever produced for the platform. Simulation games like Falcon and Flight Simulator II use the ST's graphics hardware, as do many arcade ports. The 1987 first person shooter, MIDI Maze, uses the MIDI ports to connect up to 16 machines for networked deathmatch play. The critically acclaimed Another World was originally released for ST and Amiga in 1991 with its engine developed on the ST and the rotoscoped animation created on the Amiga. Games simultaneously released on the Amiga that do not use the Amiga's superior graphics and sound capabilities were often accused by video game magazines of simply being ST ports.

Garry Kasparov became the first chess player to register a copy of ChessBase, a popular commercial database program for storing and searching records of chess games. The first version was built for Atari ST with his collaboration in January 1987. In his autobiography Child of Change, he regards this facility as "the most important development in chess research since printing".

Emulators 
Spectre GCR emulates the Macintosh. MS-DOS emulators were released in the late 1980s. PC-Ditto has a software-only version, and a hardware version that plugs into the cartridge slot or kludges internally. After running the software, an MS-DOS boot disk is required to load the system. Both run MS-DOS programs in CGA mode, though much more slowly than on an IBM PC. Other options are the PC-Speed (NEC V30), AT-Spee (Intel 80286), and ATonce-386SX (Intel 80386SX) hardware emulator boards.

Music industry
The ST's low cost, built-in MIDI ports, and fast, low-latency response times make it a favorite with musicians.

 Prominent Russian film music and song composer Aleksandr Zatsepin started using personal computers for work with Atari 1040ST and continued using Cubase and Vienna Symphonic Library.
 German electronic music pioneers Tangerine Dream relied heavily on the Atari ST in the studio and for live performances during the late 1980s and 1990s.
 The album notes for Mike Oldfield's Earth Moving state that it was recorded using an Atari ST and C-Lab MIDI software.
 The Fatboy Slim album You've Come a Long Way, Baby was created using an Atari ST.
 Electronic music artists Mike Paradinas and Luke Vibert started out writing music on Atari STs.
 In the Paris performance of Jean Michel Jarre's album Waiting for Cousteau, the Paris La Défense – Une Ville En Concert, musicians have attached Atari ST machines with C-Lab Unitor software to their keyboards, as seen in the TV live show and video recordings.
 White Town's "Your Woman", which reached #1 in the UK singles charts, was created using an Atari ST.
 The Utah Saints used a 520ST and 1040ST running Cubase during the recording of both of their albums, Utah Saints and Two, with their 1040ST still occasionally used for re-recording or remixing early tracks up to 2015.
 Atari Teenage Riot is named after the brand and programmed most music on an Atari ST, including the entire album Is This Hyperreal? (June 2011).
 Cabaret Voltaire founder Richard H. Kirk said in 2016 that he continues to write music on an Atari 1040ST with a sequencer called C-Lab.
 Darude used Cubase on an Atari 1040ST when he created his 2000 hit "Sandstorm".
 Depeche Mode used a combination of an Atari ST and Cubase in the studio during the production of Songs of Faith and Devotion in 1992. The machine is visible in footage from the making-of documentary included with the 2006 remaster of the album.
Record producer Jimmy Hotz used an Atari ST to produce Fleetwood Mac's "Tango In The Night" album, and records for B.B. King and Dave Mason.
British DJ and house producer Joey Negro.
British songwriters and record producers Stock, Aitken, and Waterman.
British synth pop duo Pet Shop Boys replaced their Fairlight CMI with an Atari ST, with their programmer Pete Gleadall saying "[Atari ST] was just much easier to work with".

Technical specifications 
All STs are made up of both custom and commercial chips.
 Custom chips:
 ST Shifter "Video shift register chip": Enables bitmap graphics using 32 KB of contiguous memory for all resolutions. Screen address has to be a multiple of 256.
 ST GLU "Generalized Logic Unit": Control logic for the system used to connect the ST's chips. Not part of the data path, but needed to bridge chips with each other.
 ST MMU "Memory Management Unit": Provides signals needed for CPU/blitter/DMA and Shifter to access dynamic RAM. Even memory accesses are given to CPU/blitter/DMA while odd cycles are reserved for DRAM refresh or used by Shifter for displaying contents of the frame buffer.
 ST DMA "Direct Memory Access": Used for floppy and hard drive data transfers. Can directly access main memory in the ST.
 Support chips:
 MC6850P ACIA "Asynchronous Common Interface Adapter": Enables the ST to directly communicate with MIDI devices and keyboard (two chips used).  for MIDI,  for keyboard.
 MC68901 MFP "Multi Function Peripheral": Used for interrupt generation/control, serial and misc. control input signals. Atari TT030 has two MFP chips.
 WD-1772-PH "Western Digital Floppy Disk Controller": Floppy controller chip.
 YM2149F PSG "Programmable Sound Generator": Provides three-voice sound synthesis, also used for floppy signalling, serial control output and printer parallel port.
 HD6301V1 "Hitachi keyboard processor": Used for keyboard scanning and mouse/joystick ports.

ST/STF/STM/STFM 
As originally released in the 520ST:

 CPU: Motorola 68000 16-/32-bit CPU @ 8 MHz. 16-bit data/32-bit internal/24-bit address.
 RAM: 512 KB or 1 MB
 Display modes (60 Hz NTSC, 50 Hz PAL, 71.2 Hz monochrome):
 Low resolution: 320 × 200 (16 color), palette of 512 colors
 Medium resolution: 640 × 200 (4 color), palette of 512 colors
 High resolution: 640 × 400, monochrome
 Sound: Yamaha YM2149 3-voice squarewave plus 1-voice white noise mono Programmable Sound Generator
 Drive: Single-sided 3" floppy disk drive, 360 KB capacity when formatted to standard 9 sector, 80 track layout.
 Ports: TV out (on ST-M and ST-FM models, NTSC or PAL standard RF modulated), MIDI in/out (with 'out-thru'), RS-232 serial, Centronics parallel (printer), monitor (RGB or Composite Video color and mono, 13-pin DIN), extra disk drive port (14-pin DIN), DMA port (ACSI port, Atari Computer System Interface) for hard disks and Atari Laser Printer (sharing RAM with computer system), joystick and mouse ports (9-pin MSX standard)
 Operating System: TOS v1.00 (TOS meaning The Operating System) with the Graphics Environment Manager (GEM)

Very early machines have the OS on a floppy disk before a final version was burned into ROM. This version of TOS was bootstrapped from a small core boot ROM.

In 1986, most production models became STFs, with an integrated single- (520STF) or double-sided (1040STF) double density floppy disk drive built-in, but no other changes. Also in 1986, the 520STM (or 520STM) added an RF Modulator for allowing the low and medium resolution color modes when connected to a TV. Later F and FM models of the 520 had a built-in double-sided disk drive instead of a single-sided one.

STE 
As originally released in the 520STE/1040STE:

 All of the features of the 520STFM/1040STFM
 Extended palette of 4,096 available colors to choose from
 Blitter chip (stylized as BLiTTER) to copy/fill/clear large data blocks with a max write rate of 4 Mbytes/s
 Hardware support for horizontal and vertical fine scrolling and split screen (using the Shifter video chip)
 DMA sound chip with 2-channels stereo 8-bit PCM sound at 6.25/12.5/25/50 kHz and stereo RCA audio-out jacks (using enhancements to the Shifter video chip to support audio shifting)
 National LMC 1992 audio controller chip, allowing adjustable left/right/master volume and bass and treble EQ via a Microwire interface
 Memory: 30-pin SIMM memory slots (SIPP packages in earliest versions) allowing upgrades up to 4 MB Allowable memory sizes including only 0.5, 1.0, 2.0, 2.5 and 4.0 MB due to configuration restraints (however, 2.5 MB is not officially supported and has compatibility problems). Later third-party upgrade kits allow a maximum of 14MB w/Magnum-ST, bypassing the stock MMU with a replacement unit and the additional chips on a separate board fitting over it.
 Ability to synchronize the video timings with an external device so that a video Genlock device can be used without having to make any modifications to computer's hardware
 Analogue joypad ports (2), with support for devices such as paddles and light pens in addition to joysticks/joypads. The Atari Jaguar joypads and Power Pad joypads (gray version of Jaguar joypads marketed for the STE and Falcon) can be used without an adapter. Two standard Atari-style digital joysticks could be plugged into each analogue port with an adapter.
 TOS 1.06 (also known as TOS 1.6) or TOS 1.62 (which fixed some major backwards-compatibility bugs in TOS 1.6) in two socketed 128 KB ROM chips.
 Socketed PLCC 68000 CPU

Models 
The members of the ST family are listed below, in roughly chronological order:

 520ST Original model with 512 KB RAM, external power supply, no floppy disk drive. The early models had only a bootstrap ROM and TOS had to be loaded from disk.
 520ST+ early 520STs with 1 MB of RAM, but without floppy disk
 260ST originally intended to be a 256 KB variant, but actually sold in small quantities in Europe with 512 KB. Used after the release of the 520ST+ to differentiate the cheaper 512 KB models from the 1  MB models. Because the early 520STs were sold with TOS on disk, which used up 192 KB of RAM, the machine only had around 256 KB left.
 520STM a 520ST with a built-in modulator for TV output and 512 KB RAM.
 520STFM a 520STM with a redesigned motherboard in a larger case with a built-in floppy disk drive (in some cases a single-sided drive only), and 512 KB RAM.
 1040STF a 520STFM with 1 MB of RAM and a built-in double-sided floppy disk drive, but without RF modulator
 1040STFM a 520STFM with 1 MB of RAM and a built-in double-sided floppy disk drive with RF modulator
 Mega ST (MEGA 1, MEGA 2, MEGA 4) redesigned motherboard with 1, 2 or 4 MB of RAM, respectively, in a much improved "pizza box" case with a detached keyboard. All MEGA mainboards have a PLCC socket for the BLiTTER chip and some early models did not include the BLiTTER chip. They also included a real-time clock and internal expansion connector. Some early MEGA 2 had a MEGA 4 mainboard with half of the memory chip places unpopulated and the MEGA 2 can be upgraded by adding the additional DRAM chips and some resistors for the control lines. The MEGA 1 mainboards had a redesigned memory chip area and could not be upgraded in this way as there are only places for the 1 MByte DRAM chips.
 520STE and 1040STE a 520STFM/1040STFM with enhanced sound, a BLiTTER chip, and a 4096-color palette, in the older 1040-style all-in-one case
 Mega STE same hardware as 1040STE except for a faster 16 MHz processor with 16K cache, an onboard SCSI controller, additional faster RS232 port, VME expansion port, in an ST gray version of the TT case
 STacy a portable (but definitely not laptop) version of the ST with the complete ST keyboard, an LCD screen simulating 640x400 hi-res, and a mini-trackball intended mostly for travellers and musicians because of the backlit screen and its built-in midi ports. Originally designed to operate on 12 standard C cell flashlight batteries for portability, when Atari finally realized how quickly the machine would use up a set of batteries (especially when rechargeable batteries of the time supplied insufficient power compared to the intended alkalines), they simply glued the lid of the battery compartment shut.
 ST BOOK a later portable ST, more portable than the STacy, but sacrificing several features in order to achieve this, notably the backlight and internal floppy disk drive. Files were meant to be stored on a small amount (one megabyte) of internal flash memory 'on the road' and transferred using serial or parallel links, memory flashcards or external (and externally powered) floppy disk to a desktop ST once back indoors. The screen is highly reflective for the time, but still hard to use indoors or in low light, it is fixed to the 640 × 400 1-bit mono mode, and no external video port was provided. Despite its limitations, it gained some popularity, particularly amongst musicians.

Unreleased 
The 130ST was intended to be a 128 KB variant. It was announced at the 1985 CES alongside the 520ST but never produced. The 4160STE was a 1040STE, but with 4 MB of RAM. A small quantity of development units were produced, but the system was never officially released. Atari did produce a quantity of 4160STE metallic case badges which found their way to dealers, so it's not uncommon to find one attached to systems which were originally 520/1040STE. No such labels were produced for the base of the systems.

Related systems 
Atari Transputer Workstation is a standalone machine developed in conjunction with Perihelion Hardware, containing modified ST hardware and up to 17 transputers capable of massively parallel operations for tasks such as ray tracing.

Clones 
Following Atari's departure from the computer market, both Medusa Computer Systems and Milan Computer manufactured Atari Falcon/TT-compatible machines with 68040 and 68060 processors. The FireBee is an Atari ST/TT clone based on the Coldfire processor. The GE-Soft Eagle is a 32 MHz TT clone.

Peripherals 
 SF354: Single-sided double-density 3-inch floppy drive (360 KB) with external power supply
 SF314: Double-sided double-density 3-inch floppy drive (720 KB) with external power supply
 PS3000: Combined 12-inch color monitor and 360k 3-inch floppy drive (SF354). Speaker. Manufactured by JVC in limited quantity (≈1000), only a few working models remain.
 SM124: Monochrome monitor, 12-inch screen, 640 × 400 pixels, 70 Hz refresh
 SM125: Monochrome monitor, 12-inch screen, up/down/sideways swivel stand, speaker, 640x400 pixels, 70 Hz refresh
 SM147: Monochrome monitor, 14-inch screen, no speaker, replacement for SM124
 SC1224: Color monitor, 12-inch screen, 640 × 200 pixels plus speaker
 SC1425: Color monitor, 14-inch screen, One speaker on the left of screen, a jack to plug ear-listeners
 SC1435: Color monitor, 14-inch screen, stereo speakers, replacement for SC1224 (rebadged Magnavox 1CM135)
 SM195: Monochrome monitor, 19-inch screen for TT030. 1280 × 960 pixels. 70 Hz refresh
 SH204: External hard drive, 20 MB MFM drive, "shoe box" case made of metal
 SH205: External hard drive, Mega ST matching case, 20 MB MFM 3.5-inch (Tandon TM262) or 5.25-inch (Segate ST225) drive with ST506 interface (became later the Megafile 20)
 Megafile 20, 30, 60: External hard drive, Mega ST matching case, ACSI bus; Megafile 30 and 60 had a 5.25-inch RLL (often a Seagate ST238R 30 MByte or Seagate ST277R 60 MByte drive) with ST506 interface
 Megafile 44: Removable cartridge drive, ACSI bus, Mega ST matching case
 SLM804: Laser printer, connected through ACSI DMA port, used ST's memory and processor to build pages for printing
 SLM605: Laser printer, connected through ACSI DMA port, smaller than SLM805.

See also
Bitstream Speedo Fonts – the fonts included in the Atari ST

Notes

References

External links 

 Atari ST Computer Systems, Peripherals and Prototypes
 Atarimania: Atari ST software preservation project
 "The little green desktop"
 BYTE Magazine September 1986, Atari ST Software Development
 Atari ST: a look from all sides

68000-based home computers
Home computers
Atari ST
Products introduced in 1985
All-in-one desktop computers